Painter was a Canadian rock band formed in 1970 in Calgary.

Band history
Painter experienced a number of personnel changes. Their big hit "West Coast Woman", from the album Painter, was released in 1973.  Other bands that came out of Painter include Hammersmith, 451 and Prototype.

Amongst their various alumni are a number of recording engineers. QSound was developed by Dan Lowe after experimenting in a recording session that involved multiple microphones set up around a studio. The technology was used on recordings in the 80s by Pink Floyd, Sting, Madonna and other noted artists and is currently being used in cellphones.

Band members

Drums and percussion
Bob 'Herb' Ego
James Llewelyn

Lead vocals
Doran 'Dorn' Beattie

Bass
Royden 'Wayne' Morice

Guitar
Dan Lowe
Barry Allen
Brad Steckel

Selected discography
Daybreak/I Do The Best I Can (1970 single)
Country Man/Lost The Sun (1973 single) (#89 in the RPM AC charts)
Painter (1973 album)

Track listing for 'Painter'
 West Coast Woman (#16 Canada) (#160 1973 Canadian YearEnd chart), (#79 US Hot 100)
 Tell Me Why
 Song For Sunshine
 Goin' Home To Rock n' Roll (#76 Canada)
 Space Truck
 Kites And Gliders
 Oh! You
 Slave Driver
 For You
 Crazy Feeling
 Goin' Down The Road

References

External links
CanConRox biography
 
QSound
Bob Ego's site
Brad Steckel's site
Nevin Park Recording Studio

Musical groups established in 1970
Musical groups from Calgary
Canadian rock music groups
1970 establishments in Alberta